Gagnac-sur-Cère (literally Gagnac on Cère) is a commune in the Lot department in south-western France.

Population

See also
Communes of the Lot department

References

Gagnacsurcere